Tanat Akimzhanuly Nuserbayev (Tañat Äkımjanūly Nöserbaev; born 1 January 1987) is a Kazakh footballer who plays as a right winger or as a forward for FC Turan, and the Kazakhstan national football team.

Career

Club
After six-season at FC Astana, Nuserbayev was released by the club on 25 December 2016. Upon leaving Astana, Nuserbayev was the club's all-time top goalscorer with 54 goals, and was ranked second for number of appearances with 195. He re-signed for FC Ordabasy on 19 January 2017.

On 28 March 2018, Nuserbayev joined FC Tobol on a season-long loan deal.

On 13 March 2019 Nuserbayev joined FC Okzhetpes.

International
Tanat made his U-21 debut on August 19, 2008 against the Poland U-21's in a 3–0 win, scoring a brace. His senior national team debut match was against England on October 11, 2008 at Wembley Stadium. Nuserbayev scored his first international goal away to the Ukraine, in a 2–1 defeat, on 10 June 2009.

Career statistics

Club

International

International goals

Honours

Club
Astana
 Kazakhstan Premier League (3): 2014, 2015, 2016 
 Kazakhstan Cup (2): 2012, 2016
 Kazakhstan Super Cup (2): 2011, 2015

References

External links

 
 
 
 

1988 births
Living people
People from Shymkent
Association football wingers
Association football forwards
Kazakhstani footballers
Kazakhstan international footballers
Kazakhstan under-21 international footballers
Kazakhstan Premier League players
FC Astana players
FC Ordabasy players
FC Tobol players
FC Turan players